 
Vancouver Fire Department may refer to:

 Vancouver Fire Department (Washington) — The fire department for Vancouver, Washington in the United States. 
 Vancouver Fire and Rescue Services — The fire department for Vancouver in British Columbia, Canada